John James Rutherford (4 March 1907 – 1983) was an English footballer.

Career
Rutherford began his career at amateur club Ilford, scoring a hat-trick as a teenager in a 3–1 away win against Ajax, before having brief spells at West Ham United and Arsenal. Rutherford later played for Tunbridge Wells Rangers.

Personal life
His father Jock was also a professional footballer as well as his uncles Sep and Bob. Rutherford's grandson, Greg Rutherford, is an Olympic long jump gold medallist.

References

1907 births
1983 deaths
English footballers
Ilford F.C. players
Arsenal F.C. players
English Football League players
West Ham United F.C. players
Footballers from South Shields
Footballers from Greater London
Association football wingers
Tunbridge Wells F.C. players